Ricky Sprocket: Showbiz Boy is a Canadian animated sitcom produced and owned by Studio B Productions (now as WildBrain). It aired on Teletoon in Canada, Nickelodeon in the United Kingdom and Nicktoons Network in the U.S. Its first airing was as a sneak peek on August 31, 2007, with regular airings in the country beginning on September 8, 2007. The final episode was aired on May 4, 2009. 26 episodes were produced with two seasons.

Production
The series was created by a London native Alison Snowden and David Fine, who also created the prime-time animated series Bob and Margaret as well as the Oscar-winning short Bob's Birthday. They co-directed the series along with Josh Mepham.

The series was produced at Studio B Productions in Vancouver, BC and was a production of Studio B, Snowden Fine, and Bejuba Entertainment. There are 52 11-minute episodes which air as half hours with two segments in each show. It was produced using Flash animation, which was done partly at Studio B and partly in the Philippines at Top Draw Animation.

Writers on the series included Russell Marcus (who also served as an executive story editor), Louise Moon, Bill Motz, and Bob Roth, Brandon Sawyer, Shane Simmons, Ian Boothby, Roger Fredericks.

Voices were recorded in Vancouver and Toronto.

Summary
Ricky Sprocket is the world's biggest child star in film. He works for Wishworks studio (a parody of DreamWorks) and for Mr. Louie Fischburger, his boss. Despite the fact that Ricky stars in some of his favorite movies, lives in a mansion, and sometimes performs brain surgeries for actor patients, otherwise he is a normal kid who doesn't let celebrity fame go to his head. He likes to hang out with his friends and shares a rivalry with spoiled female child star Kitten Kaboodle. Still, Ricky has chores and homework to do when he isn't battling animatronic props.

Characters
Ricky Sprocket (voiced by Jillian Michaels) – Ricky is the world's biggest child star in film. At age 10, he is best-known, adored, and has everything a kid could want, but he's a normal kid with normal-kid problems. He loves hanging with his pals as much as he loves making movies. One minute he's battling aliens on set, the next he's doing his homework or taking out the garbage. 
Bunny Sprocket (voiced by Jayne Eastwood) – Bunny is a down-to-earth, unsophisticated, no-nonsense mother. She is loving and devoted and only sees Ricky as a typical boy. She is more concerned with his homework and taking out the garbage than "showbiz shenanigans". She also used to be a trapeze artist in high school.
Leonard Sprocket (voiced by Jeff Lumby) – Leonard is Ricky's goofy father, but he always means well. He's a dedicated father, but  not very sophisticated. Despite his son's fame and fortune, he still works in a sausage factory and often imparts wisdom to his son with stories about sausage. Ricky's father is well-meaning, but not that bright; he can be buffoonish, which causes Ricky acute embarrassment. He loves his job at Wishworks Sausages.
Ethel Sprocket (voiced by Kathleen Barr) – Ethel is Ricky's younger sister and as smart and scheming as Ricky is charming and fun. She has no interest in her brother's movie business and would rather get him into trouble, but Ricky has occasionally come to Ethel when he needs her. 
Benny Newford (voiced by Tabitha St. Germain) – Ricky's biggest fan and pal. Often doesn't understand what Morris is talking about, but then, few people do. Benny isn't the sharpest knife in the drawer, but he makes up for it with his enthusiasm and his sheer dedication to Ricky. He is also colorblind.
Morris Moony (voiced by Ashleigh Ball) – Morris Moony is Ricky's brainy pal. He loves science and biology and excels in all academic subjects, but he is exceptionally bad in art, drama, and gym. However, he is a good rope holder and apparently good at video games. If there's a technical way of looking at anything, Morris will find it. Often refers to facts on his laptop, which he seems to have with him always.
Jamal Pennycook (voiced by Dorla Bell) – Ricky's pal. Jamal has some demeanour, but he's still just a regular kid. He's a little more streetwise than Benny and Morris, but that's not saying much. Always ready for action, Jamal is the cool kid.
Alice Applewood (voiced by Chiara Zanni) – Alice is sweet and clever, and often has good problem-solving ideas. She's kind of goofy and far more down-to-earth than Morris in her problem-solving approach. She is the least-seen of Ricky's friends.
Kitten Kaboodle (voiced by Andrea Libman) – Kitten is another child star who is often cast in the same projects as Ricky. She is precocious, competitive, demanding, and terribly jealous of Ricky and his success. She drives everyone crazy, which may be due to the example her mother sets as her domineering agent. Her father is a milquetoast. Kitten is jealous of Ricky and loves to see him fail, but when they were lost on a deserted island she gave some indication that she may actually have feelings for him.
Mr. Louie Fischburger (voiced by Scott McNeil) – Ricky’s boss. Mr. Fischburger is the head of Wishworks Studios (a parody of DreamWorks), where Ricky works. He's a small man with a big voice. He's an old time Hollywood boss and movies are his life. He treats Ricky like his own son. Well, better than his own son: he fired his own son. Besides, Ricky pays the bills. 
Wolf Wolinski (voiced by Jamie Watson) – Wolf is Ricky's regular director at Wishworks. He is driven and passionate and demanded the best from Ricky, but he also has a short fuse, so dealing with Ricky and Kitten is a trial for him. He can come across as obsessive and manic, like the stereotypical genius. 
Vanessa Stimlock (voiced by Tabitha St. Germain) – Showbiz Buzz Entertainment reporter at large. If there's a media scrum, she's leading it. Vanessa reports on all things showbiz, but seems to be especially assigned to cover Ricky Sprocket.

Episodes

Season 1 (2007)

Season 2 (2008–09)

Telecast and home media
Ricky Sprocket: Showbiz Boy aired on Teletoon in Canada, Nickelodeon in the United Kingdom and Nicktoons in the U.S. Its first airing was as a sneak peek on August 31, 2007, with regular airings in the country beginning on September 8, 2007. The final episode was aired on May 4, 2009 with repeats until the early 2010s.

The first season was released on DVD in the U.S. with eight episodes. A Canadian DVD was released on March 2009.

References

External links
 News Article from C21Media.net
 Snowden / Fine's website
 Bejuba! Entertainment website
 

2000s Canadian animated television series
2007 Canadian television series debuts
2009 Canadian television series endings
Animated television series about children
Canadian children's animated comedy television series
Canadian flash animated television series
English-language television shows
Television series by DHX Media
Teletoon original programming